To Be an Angel Blind, the Crippled Soul Divide is the third album by The Tear Garden, released four years after The Last Man to Fly.

This is the first Tear Garden album without Dwayne Goettel, with his death (and the end of Skinny Puppy) a year previously. The album tends to carry a less electronic and more somber tone to it overall as cEvin Key and others changed instrumental priorities following Goettel's death and their respective moods reflecting that death. Another member of The Legendary Pink Dots, Niels Van Hoornblower, appears on this album.

According to Edward Ka-Spel, the album was intended to be called To Be an Angel Blind, the Cripple Soul Divide, but all copies are erroneously titled as "Crippled".

Track listing
Ascension Day – 6:01
We the People – 4:49
In Search of My Rose – 4:28
Crying from Outside – 7:03
Psycho 9 – 5:22
With Wings – 5:38
Judgement Hour – 6:15
New Eden – 4:24
Tasteless – 4:51
Cyberspider – 3:53
Malice Through the Looking Glass – 7:52
Phoenix – 5:30
The Habit – 5:34

Notes
Personnel:
cEvin Key
Edward Ka-Spel
The Silverman
Ryan Moore
Martijn De Kleer
Niels Van Hoornblower

Guests:
Peggy Lee
Aeron Wild
Mark Spybey
Tom Anselmi

Produced by cEvin Key and Anthony Valcic.

Engineered by Anthony Valcic at Subconscious.

Mixed by Ken Marshall and Anthony Valcic, assisted by Frankie Verschuuren and Chris Peterson.

References

1996 albums
The Tear Garden albums
Nettwerk Records albums